Rudolf Maria Holzapfel (1874, Cracow – 1930, Muri (Kanton Bern)) was a Poland-born Austrian psychologist, philosopher. He was nominated for the Nobel Prize in Literature six times.

Literary works 
 Panidealische Psychologie der sozialen Gefühle, 1901
 Panideal. Das Seelenleben und seine soziale Neugestaltung, 2 vols., new ed., 1923
 Welterlebnis, 2 vols., 1928
 Nachgelassene Schriften, 1932

References

External links 
 
 Website Rudolf Maria Holzapfel
 Rudolf Maria Holzapfel, Biografie

Austrian psychologists
Austrian philosophers
1874 births
1930 deaths
Psychologists from the Austro-Hungarian Empire